1123 is the third studio album by American singer-songwriter BJ the Chicago Kid, named after his birthday. The album was released on July 26, 2019, by Motown Records. The album features guest appearances from Anderson .Paak, JID, Buddy, Kent Jamz, Eric Bellinger, Rick Ross, Offset and Afrojack. It received a nomination for Best R&B Album at the 62nd Annual Grammy Awards.

Release
On November 22, 2019, the deluxe edition of the album was released with three additional tracks including "Not Coming Back" with PJ Morton, "Time Today (Remix)" with Ari Lennox, and "Roses".

Critical reception

1123 received generally positive reviews from critics. At Metacritic, which assigns a normalized rating out of 100 to reviews from critics, the album received an average score of 74, which indicates "generally favorable reviews", based on four reviews.

Awards

Track listing

References

2019 albums
Motown albums